Margaret May "Maggie" Tabberer  (nee Trigar, born 11 December 1936) is an Australian fashion, publishing and media/television personality, who is a dual recipient of the Gold Logie, and who founded her own fashion label and PR companies. 
  
She is best known for her former long time position as Fashion Editor of the Australian Women's Weekly

Biography

Modelling and fashion career
Tabberer was born in Parkside, South Australia. At the age of 14 while attending her sister's wedding, Tabberer was spotted by a photographer and as a result got her first modelling job, a one-off assignment. In her early twenties she attended a modelling school and at the age of 23 was discovered by photographer Helmut Newton, who mentored her and launched a highly successful modelling career. While living in Melbourne in 1960, she won 'Model of the Year', and moved to Sydney to take advantage of the modelling opportunities there, but she chose to end her modelling career at the age of 25 after she began to lose her slim figure.

Tabberer stayed well connected to the fashion industry, however. In 1967 she started a public relations company, Maggie Tabberer & Associates, which took on many fashion-related clients and assignments. In 1981, she launched a plus-size clothing label called Maggie T.

A portrait of her by Australian artist Paul Newton was a finalist in the 1999 Archibald Prize.

Publishing and PR work
Tabberer began working in publishing when she wrote a fashion column, "Maggie Says", for the  Daily Mirror newspaper in 1963. She remained with the paper for sixteen years, until billionaire Kerry Packer asked her to become fashion editor of Australian Women's Weekly magazine in 1981, and she soon became the public face of the magazine, frequently appearing on its cover and television advertising. Tabberer stayed with Women's Weekly for fifteen years until 1996.

Television work
Tabberer began appearing on television in 1964, as one of the "beauties" on the panel talk show Beauty and the Beast (the "beast" being the show's host: Eric Baume until 1965, and then Stuart Wagstaff). Tabberer's appearances on Beauty and the Beast made her a household name, and she began hosting her own daily chat show, Maggie, for which she won two consecutive Gold Logies, in 1970 and 1971. She was the first person to win consecutive awards, although Graham Kennedy had already won three non-consecutive Gold Logies by 1970.

Since 2005, she has hosted her own television interview show, Maggie... At Home With on Australian pay TV channel Bio. (formerly The Biography Channel). On her show she "visits the homes of various Australian celebrities and elites to discuss their lives, careers, tragedies, and triumphs."

Personal life
Maggie took her surname from her first husband, Charles Tabberer, whom she married at the age of 17. They had two daughters: Brooke and Amanda. The demands of her modelling career, however, saw that marriage end after seven years.

After moving to Sydney with her daughters in 1960, Tabberer was introduced by Helmut Newton to Ettore Prossimo, an Italian restaurateur, whom she married in 1967. In that same year, Tabberer gave birth to their son, Francesco, who died of sudden infant death syndrome when ten days old. The pair separated after 17 years of marriage, although they rekindled their friendship before Prossimo's death from a heart attack in 1996.

In 1985, Tabberer announced that she was in a relationship with journalist Richard Zachariah. The couple co-presented a lifestyle television series, The Home Show, on the ABC from 1990 until 1995, when they split up.

Honours

In Queen's Birthday Honours, Maggie Tabberer was made a Member of the Order of Australia for service to the community, particularly through support for charitable organisations, and to the advancement of the Australian fashion industry.

Awards

References

External links

Maggie Tabberer AM, Harry M. Miller Management
 

1936 births
Living people
Australian female models
Australian television personalities
Women television personalities
Gold Logie winners
Members of the Order of Australia
People from Adelaide